Nemesis is the second album by American groove metal band Grip Inc.

Track listing

Personnel 
 Waldemar Sorychta – guitars, keyboards
 Gus Chambers – vocals
 Jason VieBrooks – bass
 Dave Lombardo – drums, percussion

References 

1997 albums
Grip Inc. albums
SPV/Steamhammer albums
Albums produced by Waldemar Sorychta